Rannvá Joensen (born 1 January 1986, Runavík, Faroe Islands) is a former child star and was half of the Danish pop duo, Creamy. The other half was Rebekka Mathew. The band had success in several countries. They sang the title song of the animated film "Help I'm a Fish!".

Discography 

Creamy (1999)

Æblemand, Kom Indenfor
I En Kælder Sort Som Kul
Krabbesangen
Min Kat Den Danser Tango
Fra Engeland til Skotland
Snemand Frost of frøken Tø
Dyrene i Afrika
Jeg Er En Glad Lille Cowboy
Se Min Kjole
Åh, Lars Ejnar
Jamaica
Blæsten Kan Man Ikke Få At Se

We Got the Time (2000)
I Do, I Do, I Do
Help! I'm A Fish
We Got The Time
Little Kitty
Fantasy Island (feat. Maribel The Mermaid of The All Movement Frequency & The Destinies)
Never Ending Story
Little 1
Bye Bye Bike
Do You Think I'm Pretty
Fantasy Spaceship
It Can Happen To You
Icecream

The Japanese Version includes 4 Bonus Tracks:

13.Jingle-Bell Rock
14.Joy To The World
15.Never Ending Story (Manhattan Clique Extended Remix)
16.Creamy Medley

Christmas Snow (2001)
See The Snowflakes Falling Down
Til Julebal I Nisseland
It's Christmas Time Again
Risengrød
Det Er Jul
Jingle-Bell Rock
Father Christmas
Joy To The World
Søren Banjomus
Det Kan Du Få For En Krone
Den Bedste Jul I 2000 År
Christmas Is Coming
Have Yourself A Merry Little Christmas
Glædelig Jul Til Alle (Hilsen Fra Creamy)

Singles 
1999: "Krabbesangen" 
1999: "Den Bedste Jul I 2000" / "ÅrÆblemand"
2000: "I Do, I Do, I Do"
2000: "Help! I'm a Fish"
2000: "Little Kitty" (Netherlands)
2001: "Neverending Story" (Limahl cover) (UK)
2001: "See the Snowflakes Falling Down" - (Denmark)

Familylife after Creamy 
Since leaving Creamy she has had four children, Victor (born 30 November 2003), Anton (born 13 August  2005), Liva-Maria (born 28 July 2008) and Rosa-Solveig (born 27 July 2019).

References

External links 
 
 Last.fm
 MySpace.com

1986 births
Living people
Faroese women singers
21st-century Danish women  singers